Religion in Kaduna State is a secular state, with Christian, Muslim and some indigenous religious adherents. The Sharia is valid for the areas with a
mainly Muslim population. The Roman Catholic Diocese of Zaria, the Roman Catholic Archdiocese of Kaduna and the Roman Catholic Diocese of Kafanchan have their seat in the state. An ecclesiastical province of Kaduna of the Church of Nigeria exists. The Churches of Christ are present in the state. Winners' Chapel, which has been founded by David Oyedepo, is a Megachurch in Kaduna City. When the governor of Kaduna announced to introduce Sharia, violence in Kaduna City erupted.

References

See also 
Kaduna
Nigerian sectarian violence

Kaduna State
Religion in Nigeria